34 (Northern) Signal Regiment was a Territorial Army regiment in the Royal Corps of Signals in the British Army. The regiment formed part of 12 Signal Group, providing command and control communication for NATO's Allied Rapid Reaction Corps (ARRC). As a result of the Strategic Review of Reserves it was announced on 28 April 2009 that the regiment was to be disbanded The regiment consisted of three squadrons plus the band:

History 
The 34th Signal regiment was originally formed in 1967 as a result of the merger between the 50th (Northumbrian), 49th (West Riding), 90th (North Riding) Signals Regiments and 339 Signal Squadron.  Upon formation the regiment immediately joined the 12th Signal Group to help provide communications between the Channel Ports and the rear of the 1st British Corps.  After the Options for Change the regiment moved to the 11th Signal Brigade where it was the theater communications support regiment for the Allied Rapid Reaction Corps.

Structure before disbandment 

HQ Squadron 
49 (West Riding) Signal Squadron -- SHQ and 703 (Trunk Node) Troop, Leeds and 745 Troop, Hull
50 (Northumbrian) Signal Squadron -- SHQ, Darlington and 742 (Access) Troop, Heaton
90 (North Riding) Signal Squadron -- SHQ Hartlepool and 704 (Trunk Node) Troop, Middlesbrough
Royal Signals (Northern) Band -- Darlington

Alliances 
The regiment during its time took a number of affiliations and freedoms including the following:

 Freedom of the City of Teesside
 Freedom of the City of Middlesbrough
 Freedom of the City of Darlington
 Affiliated with the Officers' Training Corps of Leeds University
 Affiliated with the Officers' Training Corps of Northumbria University

References

External links  
  - official
 History - official (Archive copy)

Regiments of the Royal Corps of Signals